Hwang Chung-gum (born 11 September 1995) is an ice hockey player of North Korea representing the Taesongsan Sports Club.

Career
Hwang began playing in 2005, in the Taesongsan Sports Club.

Pyeongchang 2018
Hwang was one of the two flag bearers for the Unified Korea team at the 2018 Winter Olympics Parade of Nations with Won Yun-jong.

Hwang is one of 12 North Korean female ice hockey players chosen to be admitted to the Unified Korea team to accompany South Korean players. Rules set by the International Olympic Committee mandate that for each game, three players of the team must be North Korean. Hwang was picked for all three games against Switzerland, Sweden, and Japan by Sarah Murray, the team's coach.

References

External links

1995 births
Ice hockey players at the 2018 Winter Olympics
Living people
North Korean women's ice hockey defencemen
North Korean women's ice hockey players
Winter Olympics competitors for Korea